Saint-Ouen-de-Sécherouvre is a commune in the Orne department in north-western France. The bass singer Antoine Sicot was born in Saint-Ouen-de-Sécherouvre.

See also
Communes of the Orne department

References

Saintouendesecherouvre